Dawn Breaks Behind the Eyes is a 2021 German mystery horror film directed by Kevin Kopacka and starring Anna Platen, Jeff Wilbusch, Luisa Taraz and Frederik von Lüttichau. It pays homage to European Gothic Horror and psychedelic films of the 1960s and 1970s. It premiered at FrightFest 2021 in London.

Synopsis
Dieter and Margot Menliff, in an unhappy marriage, visit an old castle that Margot has just inherited. When they arrive, Dieter explores the basement, while Margot examines the rest of the castle. Dieter sees something in the cellar that causes him to drop his keys and flee. Margot has a vision in a dusty mirror. Halfway through the film, a second couple, Eva Ziehnagel and Gregor Grause, is introduced.

Cast
 Anna Platen as Eva Ziehnagel
 Jeff Wilbusch as Gregor Grause
 Frederik von Lüttichau as Dieter Menliff & Klaus Moltke 
 Luisa Taraz as Margot Menliff & Lilith Tarenbach

Production

The film was written in 2017 and shot in May 2018 over the course of 23 days at the castle Herrenhaus Vogelsang in Lalendorf, Germany. The film was completely self financed by the director.

The director noted that the first cut of the movie ran over 140 minutes, whereas the final cut has a running time of 74 minutes.

Release
The film had its theatrical world premiere at FrightFest in London, England on 28 August 2021. It was additionally shown at numerous festivals including Panic Fest in the United States, Sydney Film Festival in Australia, HARD:LINE Film Festival in Germany, Chattanooga Film Festival in the United States, the Calgary Underground Film Festival in Canada, and the Buenos Aires Rojo Sangre film festival in Argentina, where it won the awards for Best Feature film and Best Cinematography.

It was released theatrically and on VOD in the United States on 24 June 2022, courtesy of Dark Sky Films and got released on the streaming platform Shudder on January 9, 2023.

Critical response 
On Rotten Tomatoes, the film currently has an approval rating of 100% based on reviews from 19 critics, with an average rating of 7.5/10. Meagan Navarro of Bloody Disgusting called it a "sumptuous visual feast" and a "gorgeous, ethereal movie full of surprising twists that deftly shift genres".

Erik Piepenburg of The New York Times wrote, "I enjoyed being visually dazzled by the film’s throupling of Eurosleaze gore, sexual psychodramatics (the castration scene is a doozy) and pastiche design. Fans of Mario Bava’s Gothic melodramas will be in heaven."

Phuong Le of The Guardian gave the film 3 out of 5 stars, noting that "Dawn Breaks Behind the Eyes will be an acquired taste, but for fans of the genre, it has the potential of becoming a cult favourite."

Mel Valentin of Screen Anarchy wrote, "Dawn Breaks Behind the Eyes (...) is an elegantly directed, impressively realized, ultra-stylish homage to ‘60s and ‘70s Euro-Gothic horror". He characterizes the conflict between Dieter and Margot as one of patriarchy and feminism, while explaining that Eva and Gregor represent the same conflict in a less violent form. Valentin commends the "series of retina-burning images and impressively staged set pieces" created by Kopacka and Dolgner. Despite noting that a "limited budget" leading to a short runtime causes some of the style and ideas to "slip into near incoherence or unintelligibility", Valentin hopes that Kopacka will direct his next film "sooner rather than later."

Sharai Bohannon of Dread Central commented extensively on the chaotic, hallucinogenic nature of the film, writing, "more of an experience than a film, Dawn Breaks Behind the Eyes is so beautiful, chaotic, and bizarre that you can’t but tip your hat to it." Kat Hughes of The Hollywood News wrote that Dawn Breaks Behind the Eyes is "a technical masterpiece made even richer by a compelling narrative." Both Bohannon and Hughes praised the film's sound design.

References

External links
 

German horror films
German independent films
2021 horror films
2021 independent films